San Ġwann is a town in the Central Region of Malta, with a population of 14,244 as of 2021. Previous to its separate administration the town used to form part of two separate localities being Birkirkara and St. Julian's.

Places and monuments in San Ġwann
 Tal-Mensija cart ruts - San Ġwann Cart Ruts - prehistoric marks on natural rock
 Ta' Ċieda Tower - Punic-Roman tower
 Ta' Xindi Farmhouse - former San Ġwann Batallian Headquarters 
 Castello Lanzun - fortified farmhouse, now the headquarters of the Order of St. Lazarus
 Santa Margerita Chapel - Tal-Imsierah Chapel
 Tal-Gharghar Chapel
 Mensija Chapel - Chapel of the Annunciation- formerly dedicated to St Leonard
 St Philip and St James Chapel
 Our Lady of Lourdes Parish Church
 San Ġwann Rural Structure with WWII Observation Post
 Embassy of the Russian Federation in Malta
 Karin Grech Garden - Central Garden in San Ġwann
 Kolonna Eterna - Eternal Column (by Paul Vella Critien)
 WW2 observation post

Local council

The current local council members are:
 Trevor Fenech (Mayor, PL)
 Anthony Mifsud Bonnici Giordani (Deputy Mayor, PL)
 Etienne Bonello Depuis (PN)
 Violet Bajada (PL)
 David Dalli (PN)
 Dominic Cassar ( PN)
 Tania Borg (PL)
 Joseph Aquilina (PN)
Executive secretary: Kurt Guillaumier

Organisations
 Għaqda Abbatini Parroċċa Marija Mmakulata ta' Lourdes 
 Mixja Neokatekumenali, San Gwann, https://knisja.mt/movimenti-kattolici/mixja-neokatekumenali/
 San Ġwann Band (Għaqda Mużikali Banda San Ġwann)
 San Ġwann Scout Group
 San Ġwann F.C.
 Our Lady of Lourdes Choir (Kor tal-Parroċċa)
 San Ġwann Knights AFC (swan amateur football club)
 Wirt Ġwann (Heritage NGO)

Zones in San Ġwann
 Fuq Wied Għomor
 Kappara
 Mensija
 Misraħ Lewża
 Monte Rosa Gardens
 San Ġwann Industrial Estate
 Ta' Raddiena
 Ta' Tuta
 Tal-Balal
 Tal-Mejda
 Tat-Tuffieh
 Taż-Żwejt
 The Village
 Wied l-Għomor
 Wied Għollieqa

San Ġwann Main Roads
 Triq Bella Vista (Bella Vista Road) 
 Triq Birkirkara (Birkirkara Road)
 Triq tal-Mensija (Mensija Road)
 Triq in-Naxxar (Naxxar Road)
 Triq is-Santwarju (Sanctuary Street)
 Triq is-Sebuqa
 Triq Pawlu Galea (Paul Galea Street)
 Triq Tal-Balal (Tal-Balal Road)
 Triq Tas-Sliema (Kappara Hill)
 Triq Ta' Żwejt (Ta' Zwejt Road)
 Vjal ir-Riħan (Rihan Avenue)
 Vjal in-Naspli (Medlar Avenue)

Twin towns – sister cities

San Ġwann is twinned with:
 Monreale, Italy
 Caraman, France

References

 
Towns in Malta
Local councils of Malta